AARHUS TECH (until 2011 Aarhus Technical School) is a technical school in Aarhus, which provides secondary education and vocational education.

The college was founded as "Prinds Frederik Ferdinands Tegne- og Søndagsskole" in 1828. Since then, the school has grown to become one of the largest technical colleges in Denmark, with 3800 students. In 2002, the college merged with AMU Østjylland.

Aarhus Tech offers degrees in 34 disciplines in vocational studies, from masonry and welding to clothing design and cooking. The annual budget is DKK 410 mio. and the school employs 650 people. It is managed as a private institution. The school comprises buildings on three separate sites in Aarhus, but the main campus is located on Christiansbjerg in Business Park Skejby, Aarhus N.

References

External links 
 Aarhus Tech

Educational institutions established in 1828
Secondary schools in Aarhus